Los Angeles Avenue may refer to:

Los Angeles avenues, numbered streets in Northeast Los Angeles
California State Route 118, which is called Los Angeles Avenue for part of its length
Los Angeles Street, street in Los Angeles California